Orcula austriaca is a species of very small air-breathing land snail, a terrestrial pulmonate gastropod mollusk in the family Orculidae. This species is endemic to Austria.

Subspecies
 Orcula austriaca austriaca Zimmermann 1932
 Orcula austriaca faueri Klemm 1967
 Orcula austriaca goelleri Gittenberger 1978
 Orcula austriaca pseudofuchsi Klemm 1967

References

  Gittenberger, E. (1978). Beiträge zur Kenntnis der Pupillacea VIII. Einiges über Orculidae. Zoologische Verhandelingen, 163: 1-44, pl. 1-4. Leiden 
 Kerney, M.P., Cameron, R.A.D. & Jungbluth, J-H. (1983). Die Landschnecken Nord- und Mitteleuropas. Ein Bestimmungsbuch für Biologen und Naturfreunde, 384 pp., 24 plates
 Bank, R. A.; Neubert, E. (2017). Checklist of the land and freshwater Gastropoda of Europe. Last update: July 16th, 2017

Orcula
Endemic fauna of Austria
Gastropods described in 1932
Taxonomy articles created by Polbot